Alu is a small borough in Rapla Parish, Rapla County, Estonia. Alu has a population of c. 950.

Alu was first mentioned in 1241 as Alafæ village in the Danish Census Book.

Alu manor
Alu Manor was first mentioned in 1409 as Alven (later known as Allo). The building is surrounded by an 11 ha park with seven ponds. After the dispossession from 1923 to 1955 a local grammar school operated in the main building. Since 1999 it houses a training centre for the Estonian Defence League.

Notable people
 (1825–1878), Baltic German military commander who served under the Russian Empire at the Russo-Turkish War.
Priit Võigemast (born 1980), Estonian film, television and stage actor

See also
 List of palaces and manor houses in Estonia

References

External links
Alu Manor at Estonian Manors Portal

Boroughs and small boroughs in Estonia
Manor houses in Estonia
Kreis Harrien